Hindu College railway station, Chennai is one of the railway stations of the Chennai Central–Arakkonam section of the Chennai Suburban Railway Network. Located about 24 km from Chennai Central railway station, the station serves the neighbourhoods of Pattabiram a suburb of Chennai. It has an elevation of 28 m above sea level.

The Hindu College is among the colleges in India to have a railway station very near. The other two are A. M. Jain College (Meenambakkam) and Loyola college (Nungambakkam)

History
The lines at the station were electrified on 29 November 1979, with the electrification of the Chennai Central–Tiruvallur section.

Commuter facilities
Every day, about 11,000 commuters use the station, including close to 4,000 students, 5,000 officegoers and 2,000 other commuters. Commuters cross the railway tracks from the Hindu College side to reach the suburban platform in the station as there is no foot overbridge. However, in 2005, a foot overbridge was sanctioned and the bridge was constructed in 2008. However, the overbridge was planned in such a way that it will connect only the two suburban platforms leaving out the mainline track, forcing the commuters to cross the railway track.

See also

 Chennai Suburban Railway
 Railway stations in Chennai

References

External links
 Hindu College railway station at Indiarailinfo.com

Stations of Chennai Suburban Railway
Railway stations in Chennai
Railway stations in Tiruvallur district